Sarasdangal is a village situated in the Dumka District in Jharkhand State, Eastern India. It is situated on the Dumka - Rampurhat Bus Route. It is under regional control of the Shikaripara Police Station. The main business of  Sarasdangal village is producing, processing, storing and transporting Stone Chips and gravel. The village is also surrounded by small local farmland. The quarries, and stone processing facilities are located on the west side of the village along road 133A. 
People of all religions live in this village.

Facilities 
The village has electricity.
The village has gravel processing facilities.

Education 
The village has one government school with classes up to year 7. The nearest high school is 12 km away in Shikaripara.

References

External links 
 Sarasdangal (Sulekha.com)

Villages in Dumka district